Milagres is Portuguese for 'miracles' and may refer to:

Milagres, Bahia, a municipality in the Brazilian state of Bahia
Milagres, Ceará, a municipality in the Brazilian state of Ceará
Milagres, Leiria, a populated locality in Portugal
Milagres (band)
Milagres Church (disambiguation)